Rifts Chaos Earth is a post-apocalyptic role-playing game from Palladium Books. It is a spinoff and prequel to their popular game Rifts, which uses a similar form of Palladium's Megaversal system.

History
In the early 2000s, Palladium was experiencing deceasing sales, so the company continued to produce new settings in an attempt to offset this, and as a result Rifts Chaos Earth (2003), a prequel to Rifts, was released and supplemented that same year by a few sourcebooks.

Description

How it was originally intended: A parallel dimension to Rifts where the massive deaths were caused a minute after midnight when the released Potential Psychic Energy (P.P.E.) from the deaths caused by a limited nuclear exchange was not magnified. Everything that happened in Rifts happened on a smaller scale in Chaos Earth. Most of humanity survives with their technology and power base but have to fend off the onslaught of supernatural. This game style can be played in Palladium's Nightbane series.

Sometime after its original press description in an early Rifter, the game changed from a parallel dimension to Rifts history, perhaps due to the level of interest in Rifts' past.  But may also be due to the developer's realization that supernatural creatures and magic in Rifts are Mega-Damage (MD) because of the high amounts of ambient PPE, which would not occur in the original concept of Chaos Earth while the tech would remain MD.  Making the game a seriously unbalanced hack and slash on the side of tech. 

The way it is now:  The Chaos Earth setting is the period in Rifts history where the deaths caused by a limited nuclear exchange happened at midnight, in proximity to the winter solstice, in conjunction with a celestial alignment; which magnified the PPE released from the deaths sending all the ley lines into overdrive.  Nexus, formed where leylines cross surge creating Rifts, large tears in the fabric of reality. This first wave was enough energy to bring Atlantis back creating tidal waves, earthquakes and even super volcano eruptions killing more people, further increasing ambient PPE.  The rifts are two way gateways and allow all kinds of monsters to enter our world.  In some locations entire new ecosystems are portaled in.  In the end very little of humanity remains and it takes centuries to get to the world depicted in Rifts where the highest tech civilizations still use Golden Age tech that they found.  

Chaos Earth gives players a chance to play in a world somewhat more recognizable than the world of Rifts. Monsters are only starting to appear and there the forces of humanity are still trying to hold on to the civilized world that Earth had been, as opposed to Rifts where characters live in a world where violence and horror have been commonplace for centuries.

Sourcebooks and mission books
Sourcebook One: Creatures of Chaos, first printing September 2003
Sourcebook Two: Rise of Magic, first printing November 2003
Resurrection was announced in February 2015. The expected release date was changed several times, and was eventually released December 2015.
First Responders has been on pre-order since June 2012 and  remains so.
NEMA Mission Book 1 was on pre-order as early as 13 May 2012, and is still on pre-order .

References

External links
Rifts Chaos Earth official discussion board at Palladium Books Forums of the Megaverse
Rifts Chaos Earth at RPG Geek Database
Rifts Chaos Earth at RPGnet Game Index

Megaverse (Palladium Books)
Post-apocalyptic role-playing games
Rifts (role-playing game)
Science fiction role-playing games
Role-playing games introduced in 2003
Video games about parallel universes